Spathius is a genus of doryctine wasps. The larvae of this genus of wasps feed on beetle larvae. They act as controllers of the parasitic Hylurgopinus rufipes.

References 

 Belokobylskij, S.A.; Austin, A.D. 2013: New species of flightless doryctine parasitoid wasps (Hymenoptera: Braconidae: Doryctinae) from Australia and New Zealand. Australian journal of entomology, 52(4), pages 338–355, 
 Belokobylskij & Maeto 2009: Doryctinae (Hymenoptera: Braconidae) of Japan. Volume 1. Natura optima dux Foundation, Warszawa, 2009, pages 1–806
 Belokobylskij, S.A.; Samartsev, K.G. 2014: Palaearctic species of the Spathius exarator species group (Hymenoptera: Braconidae: Doryctinae) with entirely sculptured mesopleuron. Zootaxa 3900 (4), pages 483–504,  
 Tang, P., Belokobylskij, S. & Chen, X-X. 2015: Spathius Nees, 1818 (Hymenoptera: Braconidae, Doryctinae) from China with a key to species. Zootaxa 3960 (1), pages 1–132,

External links 
 
 
 

Braconidae genera